Baerida is an order of sea sponges in the subclass of Calcaronea, first described in 2000 by Radovan Borojevic, Nicole Boury-Esnault and Jean Vacelet.

Species of the order Baerida are leuconoid calcareous sponges with the skeleton either composed exclusively of micro-diactines, or in which microdiactines constitute exclusively or predominantly a specific sector of the skeleton, such as choano-skeleton or atrial skeleton. Large or giant spicules are frequently present in the cortical skeleton, from which they can partially or fully invade the choanoderm. In sponges with a reinforced cortex, the inhalant pores can be restricted to a sieve-like ostia-bearing region. Dagger-shaped small tetractines (pugioles) are frequently the sole skeleton of the exhalant aquiferous system. Although the skeleton may be highly reinforced by the presence of dense layers of microdiactines in a specific region, an aspicular calcareous skeleton is not.

References.

External links

 http://species-identification.org/species.php?species_group=sponges&id=12&menuentry=groepen

Calcaronea
Taxa named by Nicole Boury-Esnault
Taxa named by Jean Vacelet